The M-497 (nicknamed Black Beetle by the press) was an experimental jet-powered railcar test bed of the New York Central Railroad, developed and tested in 1966 in the United States. Two second-hand General Electric J47-19 jet engines, originally used as boosters for the Convair B-36 Peacemaker intercontinental bomber, were mounted atop an existing Budd Rail Diesel Car, an RDC-3 of coach and baggage-mail configuration which had received a streamlined front cowling. The construct was then successfully sent on test runs over the existing tracks between Butler, Indiana, and Stryker, Ohio. The line had been chosen for its arrow-straight layout and good condition, but otherwise unmodified track.

Even with this spectacular performance, and even though it had been built relatively cheaply, using existing parts, the project was not considered viable commercially. The railroad gathered valuable test data regarding the stresses of high-speed rail travel on conventional equipment and tracks then existing in America. The data was largely ignored, as NYC was headed for a merger with its arch-rival Pennsylvania Railroad that was already heavily involved in the Metroliner project, funded by the United States Department of Transportation. 

M-497 continued to serve for Penn Central after the jet engines were removed until retirement by Conrail in 1977. The engines were re-used as X29493, an experimental snow blower. Like most similar jet engine blowers, it was effective at clearing snow and ice but also tended to dislodge the ballast.

See also
 Turbojet train
 LIMRV

References

External links
Photo of the train

Gas turbine locomotives of the United States 
High-speed trains of the United States
Experimental locomotives
New York Central Railroad locomotives
Scrapped locomotives